In digital electronics, a NAND gate (NOT-AND) is a logic gate which produces an output which is false only if all its inputs are true; thus its output is complement to that of an AND gate. A LOW (0) output results only if all the inputs to the gate are HIGH (1); if any input is LOW (0), a HIGH (1) output results. A NAND gate is made using transistors and junction diodes. By De Morgan's laws, a two-input NAND gate's logic may be expressed as =+, making a NAND gate equivalent to inverters followed by an OR gate. 

The NAND gate is significant because any boolean function can be implemented by using a combination of NAND gates. This property is called functional completeness. It shares this property with the NOR gate. Digital systems employing certain logic circuits take advantage of NAND's functional completeness.

The function  is logically equivalent to 

NAND gates with two or more inputs are available as integrated circuits in transistor-transistor logic, CMOS, and other logic families.

Symbols 
There are three symbols for NAND gates: the MIL/ANSI symbol, the IEC symbol and the deprecated DIN symbol sometimes found on old schematics. For more information see logic gate symbols. The ANSI symbol for the NAND gate is a standard AND gate with an inversion bubble connected.

Hardware description and pinout 
NAND gates are basic logic gates, and as such they are recognised in TTL and CMOS ICs.

CMOS version 
The standard, 4000 series, CMOS IC is the 4011, which includes four independent, two-input, NAND gates.

Availability 
These devices are available from many semiconductor manufacturers. These are usually available in both through-hole DIL and SOIC format. Datasheets are readily available in most datasheet databases.

The standard 2-, 3-, 4- and 8-input NAND gates are available:

 CMOS
 4011: Quad 2-input NAND gate
 4023: Triple 3-input NAND gate
 4012: Dual 4-input NAND gate
 4068: Mono 8-input NAND gate
 TTL
 7400: Quad 2-input NAND gate
 7410: Triple 3-input NAND gate
 7420: Dual 4-input NAND gate
 7430: Mono 8-input NAND gate

Implementations

Functional completeness 

The NAND gate has the property of functional completeness, which it shares with the NOR gate. That is, any other logic function (AND, OR, etc.) can be implemented using only NAND gates. An entire processor can be created using NAND gates alone. In TTL ICs using multiple-emitter transistors, it also requires fewer transistors than a NOR gate.

As NOR gates are also functionally complete, if no specific NAND gates are available, one can be made from NOR gates using NOR logic.

See also 
Sheffer stroke
AND gate
OR gate
NOT gate
NOR gate
XOR gate
XNOR gate
NOR logic
Boolean algebra
 Flash memory

References

External links
 TTL NAND and AND gates – All About Circuits

NAND gate